"Talk About" is a song by English DJ Rain Radio and Irish DJ Craig Gorman.

Released on 14 May 2021, it is a dance track based on an interpolation of "Big Hoops (Bigger the Better)" by Canadian singer Nelly Furtado. It became a hit in the UK, debuting at No. 44 (for the week ending 15 July 2021) after amassing a sales total of 9,289 units, and was a new entry at No. 42 in Ireland. The song eventually reached the top 10 in both countries, at No. 9.

Charts

Weekly charts

Year-end charts

Certifications

References

2021 songs
2021 debut singles
House music songs
Songs written by Nelly Furtado
Songs written by Rodney Jerkins
Polydor Records singles